The Zanzottera MZ 301 is a three-cylinder, in-line two-stroke, dual ignition aircraft engine designed for ultralight aircraft.

The engine was originally designed and produced by Zanzottera Technologies of Italy, but the design was sold, along with the rest of the company's two-stroke ultralight aircraft engine line, to Compact Radial Engines of Surrey, British Columbia, Canada. Compact Radial Engines was then in turn acquired by Fiate Aviation Co., Ltd. of Hefei, Anhui, China in August 2017. Fiate Aviation did not advertise the engine as available in 2021.

Development
The MZ 301 was developed first as a fuel injected  lightweight competitor to the more expensive liquid-cooled four stroke  Rotax 912. Later a carbureted version of the MZ 301 was developed with three Bing 54 carburetors and producing .

The MZ 301 has cylinder barrels that are Nikasil-coated. The bore and stroke are the same as the single cylinder MZ 34 engine and twin-cylinder MZ 201 and MZ 202 powerplants . The MZ 301 features electric starting and the RZ2 gearbox with optional reduction ratios of 2.18, 2.55, 2.88, 3.11 or 3.66 to 1.

Variants
MZ 301 with three carburetors
Three-cylinder, fan-cooled, two stroke dual ignition  at 5,800 rpm aircraft engine. Equipped with three Bing 54 carburetors. Weight  with electric starter, 3 into 1 exhaust manifold and muffler.
MZ 301 with fuel injection
Three-cylinder, fan-cooled, two stroke dual ignition  at 6,250 rpm aircraft engine. Equipped with multipoint fuel injection. Weight  with electric starter, battery, fuel injection system, fuel pump, three mufflers and RZ2 gearbox.

Applications
Mosquito Aviation XE

Specifications (MZ 301)

See also

References

Compact Radial Engines aircraft engines
Zanzottera aircraft engines
Air-cooled aircraft piston engines
Two-stroke aircraft piston engines
Straight-three engines